Robert Johns may refer to:

 Robert H. Johns (born 1942), American meteorologist
 Robert J. Johns, labour organizer in Manitoba, Canada

See also
 Robert Jones (disambiguation)